The 1963 International cricket season was from May 1963 to August 1963.

Season overview

June

West Indies in England

July

Denmark in Netherlands

References

1963 in cricket